Dwayne Haare (born 9 June 1980) is a New Zealand professional rugby union player. He currently plays at flanker for Bayonne in the Top 14.

References

External links
Ligue Nationale De Rugby Profile
European Professional Club Rugby Profile
Bayonne Profile

Living people
1980 births
New Zealand rugby union players
Rugby union flankers